Cordylocera elegans is a species of soldier beetles (insects in the family Cantharidae).

References

External links 

 
 Cordylocera elegans at insectoid.info
 Cordylocera elegans at gbif.org

Beetles described in 1964
Cantharidae